Cameraria cervina is a moth of the family Gracillariidae. It is known from New York, United States.

The wingspan is about 6 mm.

References

Cameraria (moth)

Moths of North America
Lepidoptera of the United States
Moths described in 1907
Taxa named by Thomas de Grey, 6th Baron Walsingham